Sylvester Maurus 	(31 December 1619 – 13 January 1687) was an Italian Jesuit theologian.

Life
Sylvester Maurus was born in Spoleto, Italy, on 31 December 1619 to a noble family. He entered the Society of Jesus, 21 April 1636. After his novitiate, he spent three years (1639-1642) studying philosophy at the Roman College, where his principal teacher was Sforza Pallavicino. Following a period in which he taught grammar, Maurus studied theology from 1644 to 1648, again at the Roman College. Having completed his theological program, he taught philosophy at the Jesuit college in Macerata from 1649 to 1652. Recalled to Rome, he served a year as regent of studies for Jesuit seminarians. He took final vows in the Order in 1654, and five years later was promoted to the Chair of Theology, which he retained until his appointment in 1684 as Rector of the Roman College. Maurus died on 13 January 1687 in Rome.

Works
His works include:

 Quæstionum philosophicarum Sylvestri Mauri, Soc. Jesu, in Collegio Romano Philosophiæ Professoris. This work is divided into four books, and appeared at Rome in 1658. A second edition was issued in 1670. The latest edition, in three volumes, is prefaced by a letter of Father Matteo Liberatore, and appeared in Le Mans, 1875-76. 
 Aristotelis opera quæ extant omnia, brevi paraphrasi, ac litteræ perpetuo inhærente explanatione illustrata. The work appeared in six volumes, Rome, 1668. The second volume, containing Aristotle's moral philosophy, was edited anew in 1696-98. The whole work was published again in Paris, 1885–87, by Fathers Ehrle, Felchlin, and Beringer; this edition formed part of the collection entitled Bibliotheca Theologiæ et Philosophiæ scholasticæ. 
 Quæstionum theologicarum, libri sex, published at Rome, 1676–79; this work contains all the principal theological treatises. 
 Opus theologicum, published in three folio volumes at Rome, 1687, treats of all the main questions of theology concisely. The first volume contains some information concerning the author, and also his picture engraved by Louis Lenfant.

References
 
 Amann, Émile, Dictionnaire de théologie catholique 10.1:447–448.
 
 
 
 

1619 births
1687 deaths
17th-century Italian Jesuits
17th-century Italian Roman Catholic theologians
People from Spoleto
17th-century Italian philosophers